In algebraic topology and topological data analysis, the  Čech complex is an abstract simplicial complex constructed from a point cloud in any metric space which is meant to capture topological information about the point cloud or the distribution it is drawn from. Then, for each , let  if the set of ε-balls centered at points of σ has a nonempty intersection. In other words, the Čech complex is the nerve of the set of ε-balls centered at points of X. By the nerve lemma, the  Čech complex is homotopy equivalent to the union of the balls, also known as the Offset Filtration.

Relation to Vietoris–Rips complex
The Čech complex is a subcomplex of the Vietoris–Rips complex. While the Čech complex is more computationally expensive than the Vietoris–Rips complex, since we must check for higher order intersections of the balls in the complex, the nerve theorem provides a guarantee that the Čech complex is homotopy equivalent to union of the balls in the complex. The Vietoris-Rips complex may not be.

See also

 Vietoris–Rips complex
 Topological data analysis
 Čech cohomology
 Computational geometry
 Abstract simplicial complex
 Simplicial complex
 Simplicial homology

References

Algebraic topology